James Patterson has written or co-written many "Bookshots" or novellas, and has co-written books with many authors. The list below separates the works into four main categories: fiction written for adults, for young adults and for children, and non-fiction.

Fiction written for adults

Novels 

Cross series
 Alex Cross series:
 Along Came a Spider (1993), Boston: Little, Brown and Company 
 Kiss the Girls (1995), Boston: Little, Brown and Company 
 Jack and Jill (1996), Boston: Little, Brown and Company 
 Cat and Mouse (1997), Boston: Little, Brown and Company 
 Pop Goes the Weasel (1999), Boston: Little, Brown and Company 
 Roses Are Red (2000), Boston: Little, Brown and Company 
 Violets Are Blue (2001), Boston: Little, Brown and Company 
 Four Blind Mice (2002), Boston: Little, Brown and Company 
 The Big Bad Wolf (2003), Boston: Little, Brown and Company 
 London Bridges (2004), New York: Little, Brown and Company 
 Mary, Mary (2005), New York: Little, Brown and Company 
 Cross, or Alex Cross (2006), New York: Little, Brown and Company 
 Double Cross (2007), New York: Little, Brown and Company 
 Cross Country (2008), New York: Little, Brown and Company 
 Alex Cross's Trial (2009), with Richard DiLallo, New York: Little, Brown and Company 
 I, Alex Cross (2009), New York: Little, Brown and Company 
 Cross Fire (2010), New York: Little, Brown and Company 
 Kill Alex Cross (2011), New York: Little, Brown and Company 
 Merry Christmas, Alex Cross (2012), New York: Little, Brown and Company 
 Alex Cross, Run (2013), New York: Little, Brown and Company 
 Cross My Heart (2013), New York: Little, Brown and Company 
 Hope to Die (2014), New York: Little, Brown and Company 
 Cross Justice (2015), New York: Little, Brown and Company 
 Cross the Line (2016), New York: Little, Brown and Company 
 The People vs. Alex Cross (2017), New York: Little, Brown and Company 
 Target: Alex Cross (2018), New York: Little, Brown and Company 
 Criss Cross (2019), New York: Little, Brown and Company 
 Deadly Cross (2020), New York: Little, Brown and Company 
 Fear No Evil (2021), New York: Little, Brown and Company 
 Triple Cross (2022), New York: Little, Brown and Company 
 Others:
 "Action" (2014), with Brent Gargan, short story
 "Cross Kill" (2016), novella, New York: BookShots 
 "Detective Cross" (2017), novella, New York: BookShots
 Ali Cross series:
 Ali Cross (2019)
 Ali Cross: Like Father Like Son (2021)
 Ali Cross: The Secret Detective (2022)

Travis McKinley series
 Miracle on the 17th Green (1996), with Peter de Jonge, Boston: Little, Brown and Company 
 Miracle at Augusta (2015), with Peter de Jonge, New York: Little, Brown and Company 
 Miracle at St. Andrews (2019), with Peter de Jonge, New York: Little, Brown and Company

When the Wind Blows series
 When the Wind Blows (1998), New York: Little, Brown and Company 
 The Lake House (2003), New York: Little, Brown and Company 

Women's Murder Club series
 1st to Die (2001), Boston: Little, Brown and Company 
 2nd Chance (2002), with Andrew Gross, Boston: Little, Brown and Company 
 3rd Degree (2004), with Andrew Gross, New York: Little, Brown and Company 
 4th of July (2005), with Maxine Paetro, New York: Little, Brown and Company 
 The 5th Horseman (2006), with Maxine Paetro, New York: Little, Brown and Company 
 The 6th Target (2007), with Maxine Paetro, New York: Little, Brown and Company 
 7th Heaven (2008), with Maxine Paetro, New York: Little, Brown and Company 
 The 8th Confession (2009), with Maxine Paetro, New York: Little, Brown and Company 
 The 9th Judgment (2010), with Maxine Paetro, New York: Little, Brown and Company 
 10th Anniversary (2011), with Maxine Paetro, New York: Little, Brown and Company 
 11th Hour (2012), with Maxine Paetro, New York: Little, Brown and Company 
 12th of Never (2013), with Maxine Paetro, New York: Little, Brown and Company 
 Unlucky 13 (2014), with Maxine Paetro, New York: Little, Brown and Company 
 14th Deadly Sin (2015), with Maxine Paetro, New York: Little, Brown and Company 
 15th Affair (2016), with Maxine Paetro, New York: Little, Brown and Company 
 15.5. "The Trial" (2016), with Maxine Paetro, novella, New York: Little, Brown and Company 
 16th Seduction (2017), with Maxine Paetro, New York: Little, Brown and Company 
 16.5. "The Medical Examiner" (2017), with Maxine Paetro, novella
 17th Suspect (2018), with Maxine Paetro, New York: Little, Brown and Company 
 18th Abduction (2019), with Maxine Paetro, New York: Little, Brown and Company 
 19th Christmas (2019), with Maxine Paetro, New York: Little, Brown and Company 
 20th Victim (2020), with Maxine Paetro, New York: Little, Brown and Company 
 21st Birthday (2021), with Maxine Paetro, New York: Little, Brown and Company 
 22 Seconds (2022), with Maxine Paetro, New York: Little, Brown and Company 

Honeymoon series
 Honeymoon (2005), with Howard Roughan, New York: Little, Brown and Company 
 Second Honeymoon (2013), with Howard Roughan, New York: Little, Brown and Company 

Michael Bennett series
 Step on a Crack (2007), with Michael Ledwidge, New York: Little, Brown and Company 
 Run for Your Life (2009), with Michael Ledwidge, New York: Little, Brown and Company 
 Worst Case (2010), with Michael Ledwidge, New York: Little, Brown and Company 
 Tick Tock (2011), with Michael Ledwidge, New York: Little, Brown and Company 
 I, Michael Bennett (2012), with Michael Ledwidge, New York: Little, Brown and Company 
 Gone (2013), with Michael Ledwidge, New York: Little, Brown and Company 
 Burn (2014), with Michael Ledwidge, New York: Little, Brown and Company 
 Alert (2015), with Michael Ledwidge, New York: Little, Brown and Company 
 Bullseye (2016), with Michael Ledwidge, New York: Little, Brown and Company 
 9.5. "Chase" (2016), with Michael Ledwidge, novella
 Haunted (2017), with James O. Born, New York: Little, Brown and Company 
 10.5. "Manhunt" (2017), with James O. Born, novella
 Ambush (2018), with James O. Born, New York: Little, Brown and Company 
 Blindside (2020), with James O. Born, New York: Little, Brown and Company 
 The Russian (2021), with James O. Born, New York: Little, Brown and Company 
 Shattered (2022), with James O. Born, New York: Little, Brown and Company 

Private series
 Private (2010), with Maxine Paetro, New York: Little, Brown and Company 
 Private #1 Suspect (2012), with Maxine Paetro, New York: Little, Brown and Company 
 Private Games (2012), with Mark T. Sullivan, New York: Little, Brown and Company 
 Private London (2011), with Mark Pearson, New York: Grand Central Publishing 
 Private Berlin (2013), with Mark T. Sullivan, New York: Little, Brown and Company 
 Private L.A. (2013), with Mark T. Sullivan, New York: Little, Brown and Company 
 Private: Oz, or Private Down Under (2012), with Michael White, New York: Grand Central Publishing 
 Private India, or Private India: City on Fire (2014), with Ashwin Sanghi, New York: Grand Central Publishing 
 Private Vegas (2015), with Maxine Paetro, New York: Little, Brown and Company 
 Private Paris (2016), with Mark T. Sullivan, New York: Little, Brown and Company 
 The Games: A Private Novel, or Private Rio (2016), with Mark T. Sullivan, New York: Little, Brown and Company 
 Private: Missing, or Private Sydney (2016), with Kathryn Fox, New York: Grand Central Publishing 
 12.5. "Private Royals" (2016), with Rees Jones, novella, Bookshots 
 Count to Ten: A Private Novel, or Private Delhi (2017), with Ashwin Sanghi
 13.5. "Private Gold" (2017), with Jassy Mackenzie, novella
 Princess: A Private Novel, or Private Princess (2018), with Rees Jones, New York: Little, Brown and Company 

Zoo series
 Zoo (2012), with Michael Ledwidge, New York: Little, Brown and Company 
 1.5. "Zoo 2" (2016), with Max DiLallo, novella

NYPD Red series
 NYPD Red (2012), with Marshall Karp, New York: Little, Brown and Company 
 NYPD Red 2 (2014), with Marshall Karp, New York: Little, Brown and Company 
 NYPD Red 3 (2015), with Marshall Karp, New York: Little, Brown and Company 
 NYPD Red 4 (2016), with Marshall Karp, New York: Little, Brown and Company 
 NYPD Red 5, or Red Alert (2018), with Marshall Karp, New York: Little, Brown and Company 
 NYPD Red 6 (2020), with Marshall Karp, ISBN 978-1538703014

Invisible series
 Invisible (2014), with David Ellis, New York: Little, Brown and Company 
 Unsolved (2019), with David Ellis

Detective Harriet Blue series
 0.5. "Black & Blue" (2016), with Candice Fox, novella
 Never Never (2016), with Candice Fox, Boston: Little, Brown and Company 
 Fifty Fifty (2017), with Candice Fox, Boston: Little, Brown and Company 
 Liar Liar (2018), with Candice Fox, Boston: Little, Brown and Company 
 Hush Hush (2019), with Candice Fox

David Shelley series
 0.5. "Hunted" (2016), with Andrew Holmes, novella
 Revenge (2018), with Andrew Holmes, New York: Knopf & Little, Brown and Company

Caleb Rooney series
 0.5. "Killer Chef" (2016), with Jeffrey J. Keyes, novella
 The Chef (2019), with Max DiLallo, New York: Little, Brown and Company 

Crazy House series
 Crazy House (2017), with Gabrielle Charbonnet, Boston: Little, Brown and Company 
 Fall of Crazy House (2018), with Gabrielle Charbonnet, Boston: Little, Brown and Company 

Instinct series
 Murder Games, or Instinct (2017), with Howard Roughan, New York: Little, Brown and Company 
 Killer Instinct (2019), with Howard Roughan
 Steal (2022), with Howard Roughan

Billy Harney series
 The Black Book (2017), with David Ellis, New York: Little, Brown and Company 
 The Red Book (2021), with David Ellis, New York: Little, Brown and Company 
 Escape (2022), with David Ellis, New York: Little, Brown and Company

Rory Yates series
 Texas Ranger (2018), with Andrew Bourelle, New York: Little, Brown and Company 
 Texas Outlaw (2020), with Andrew Bourelle

Amy Cornwall series
 Out of Sight or The Cornwalls are gone (2019), with Brendan DuBois 
 Countdown (2023), with Brendan DuBois 

Stand-alones
 The Thomas Berryman Number (1976), Boston: Little, Brown and Company 
 Season of the Machete (1977), New York: Warner Books 
 See How They Run, or The Jericho Commandment (1979), New York: Warner Books 
 Virgin, or Cradle and All (1980), New York: McGraw Hill 
 Black Market, or Black Friday (1986), New York: Simon and Schuster 
 The Midnight Club (1989), Boston: Little, Brown and Company 
 Hide and Seek (1996), Boston: Little, Brown and Company 
 Suzanne's Diary for Nicholas (2001), Boston: Little, Brown and Company 
 The Beach House (2002), with Peter de Jonge, Boston: Little, Brown and Company 
 The Jester (2003), with Andrew Gross, Boston: Little, Brown and Company 
 Sam's Letters to Jennifer (2004), New York: Little, Brown and Company 
 Lifeguard (2005), with Andrew Gross, New York: Little, Brown and Company 
 Beach Road (2006), with Peter de Jonge, New York: Little, Brown and Company 
 Judge and Jury (2006), with Andrew Gross, New York: Little, Brown and Company 
 The Quickie (2007), with Michael Ledwidge, New York: Little, Brown and Company 
 You've Been Warned (2007), with Howard Roughan, New York: Little, Brown and Company 
 Sail (2008), with Howard Roughan, New York: Little, Brown and Company 
 Sundays at Tiffany's (2008), with Gabrielle Charbonnet, New York: Little, Brown and Company 
 Swimsuit (2009), with Maxine Paetro, New York: Little, Brown and Company 
 Don't Blink (2010), with Howard Roughan, New York: Little, Brown and Company 
 The Postcard Killers (2010), with Liza Marklund, New York: Little, Brown and Company 
 Bloody Valentine (2011), with K.A. John, London: Arrow Books 
 Kill Me If You Can (2011), with Marshall Karp, New York: Little, Brown and Company 
 Now You See Her (2011), with Michael Ledwidge, New York: Little, Brown and Company 
 The Christmas Wedding (2011), with Richard DiLallo, New York: Little, Brown and Company 
 Toys (2011), with Neil McMahon, New York: Little, Brown and Company 
 Guilty Wives (2012), with David Ellis, New York: Little, Brown and Company 
 Mistress (2013), with David Ellis, New York: Little, Brown and Company 
 The Murder House (2015), with David Ellis, New York: Little, Brown and Company 
 Truth or Die (2015), with Howard Roughan, New York: Little, Brown and Company 
 Woman of God (2016), with Maxine Paetro, New York: Little, Brown and Company 
 Black Dress Affair (2017), with Susan DiLallo, New York: BookShots 
 Expelled (2017), with Emily Raymond, Jimmy Patterson 
 The Store (2017), with Richard DiLallo, Little, Brown and Company 
 Juror No. 3, or Juror #3 (2018), with Nancy Allen, New York: Knopf & Little, Brown and Company 
 The 13-Minute Murder (2018), with Shan Serafin, New York: Grand Central Publishing 
 The First Lady (2018), with Brendan DuBois, New York: Knopf & Little, Brown and Company 
 The President Is Missing (2018), with Bill Clinton, New York: Knopf & Little, Brown and Company 
 The Cornwalls Are Gone (2019), with Brendan DuBois, New York: Little, Brown and Company 
 The Inn (2019), with Candice Fox, Little, Brown and Company 
 The Warning (2019), with Robison Wells, Little, Brown and Company 
 Lost (2020), with James O. Born, Little, Brown and Company
 The Summer House (2020), with Brendan DuBois, Little, Brown and Company 
 1st Case (2020), with Chris Tebbetts, Little, Brown and Company 
 Cajun Justice (2020), with Tucker Axum, Grand Central Publishing 
 The Coast-to-Coast Murders (2020), with J. D. Barker
 The Midwife Murders (2020), with Richard DiLallo, Grand Central Publishing 
 Three Women Disappear (2020), with Shan Serafin, New York: Little, Brown and Company 
 The President's Daughter (2021), with Bill Clinton, Little, Brown and Company 
 The Shadow (2021), with Brian Sitts, Grand Central Publishing 
 The Noise: A Thriller (2021), with J. D. Barker, Little, Brown and Company
 2 Sisters Detective Agency (2021), with Candice Fox, Grand Central Publishing
 Run, Rose, Run (2022), with Dolly Parton, Little, Brown and Company 
 Death of the Black Widow (2022), with J. D. Barker, Grand Central Publishing 
 Blowback (2022), with Brendan DuBois, Little, Brown and Company

Short stories 

Collections
 Triple Threat (2016), with Max DiLallo and Andrew Bourelle, collection of 3 novellas:
 "Cross Kill" (Alex Cross series), "Zoo 2" (Zoo series #1.5), "The Pretender"
 Kill or Be Killed (2016), with Maxine Paetro, Emily Raymond, Rees Jones and Shan Serafin, collection of 4 novellas:
 "The Trial" (Women's Murder Club series #15.5), "Little Black Dress", "Heist", "The Women's War"
 The Moores are Missing (2017), with Loren D. Estleman, Sam Hawken and Ed Chatterton, collection of 3 novellas:
 "The Moores are Missing", "The Housewife", "Absolute Zero"
 The Moores Are Missing (2017), with Loren D. Estleman and Lee Stone, collection of 3 novellas:
 "The Moores are Missing", "Kill and Tell", "Dead Heat"
 Two From the Heart (2017), with Emily Raymond, Frank Constantini and Brian Sitts, collection of 2 novellas:
 "Tell Me Your Best Story", "The Lifesaver"
 The Family Lawyer (2017), with Robert Rotstein, Christopher Charles and Rachel Howzell Hall, collection of 3 novellas:
 "The Family Lawyer", "Night Sniper", "The Good Sister"
 Triple Homicide (2017), with Maxine Paetro and James O. Born, collection of 3 novellas:
 "Detective Cross" (Alex Cross series), "The Medical Examiner" (Women's Murder Club series #16.5), "Manhunt" (Michael Bennett series #10.5)
 Murder in Paradise (2018), with Doug Allyn, Connor Hyde and Duane Swierczynski, collection of 3 novellas:
 "The Lawyer Lifeguard", "The Doctor's Plot", "The Shut-In"
 The House Next Door (2019), with Susan DiLallo, Max DiLallo and Tim Arnold, New York: Grand Central Publishing , collection of 3 novellas:
 "The House Next Door", "The Killer's Wife", "We. Are. Not. Alone"

All novellas

Jon Roscoe Thriller series:
 "The Hostage" (2016), with Robert Gold
 "The Verdict" (2016), with Robert Gold
 "Kidnapped" (2016), with Robert Gold

Detective Luc Moncrief series:
 "French Kiss" (2016), with Richard DiLallo
 "The Christmas Mystery" (2016), with Richard DiLallo
 "French Twist" (2017), with Richard DiLallo

Owen Taylor series:
 "The End" (2017), with Brendan DuBois
 "After the End" (2017), with Brendan DuBois

Mitchum series:
 "Hidden" (2017), with James O. Born
 "Malicious" (2017), with James O. Born
 "Malevolent" (2020), with James O. Born
 Omnibus: The River Murders (2020), with James O. Born

Stand-alones:
 "Action" (2014), with Brent Gargan, short story (Alex Cross series)
 "$10,000,000 Marriage Proposal" (2016), with Hilary Liftin
 "113 Minutes" (2016), with Max DiLallo
 "Airport: Code Red" (2016), with Michael White, Penguin 
 "Black & Blue" (2016), with Candice Fox (Detective Harriet Blue series #0.5)
 "Break Point" (2016), with Lee Stone, Bookshots 
 "Chase" (2016), with Michael Ledwidge (Michael Bennett series #9.5)
 "Come and Get Us" (2016), with Shan Serafin
 "Cross Kill" (2016) (Alex Cross series)
 "Dead Heat" (2016), with Lee Stone
 "Heist" (2016), with Rees Jones
 "Hunted" (2016), with Andrew Holmes (David Shelley series #0.5)
 "Killer Chef" (2016), with Jeffrey J. Keyes (Caleb Rooney series #0.5)
 "Let's Play Make-Believe" (2016) also known as "The Palm Beach Murders" (2021), with James O. Born, Grand Central Publishing 
 "Little Black Dress" (2016), with Emily Raymond
 "Private Royals" (2016), with Rees Jones, Bookshots  (Private series #12.5)
 "Taking the Titanic" (2016), with Scott Slaven
 "The Mating Season" (2016), with Laurie Horowitz
 "The Pretender" (2016), with Andrew Bourelle
 "The Trial" (2016), with Maxine Paetro, New York: Little, Brown and Company  (Women's Murder Club series #15.5)
 "The Women's War" (2016), with Shan Serafin
 "Zoo 2" (2016), with Max DiLallo (Zoo series #1.5)
 "Absolute Zero" (2017), with Ed Chatterton
 "Achilles" (2017)
 "Avalanche" (2017), with David Inglish
 "Christmas Sanctuary" (2017), with Lauren Hawkeye
 "Dead Man Running" (2017), with Christopher Farnsworth
 "Deadly Cargo" (2017), with Will Jordan, Bookshots 
 "Detective Cross" (2017) (Alex Cross series)
 "Diary of a Succubus" (2017), with Derek Nikitas
 "Kill and Tell" (2017), with Scott Slaven
 "Love Me Tender" (2017), with Laurie Horowitz
 "Manhunt" (2017), with James O. Born (Michael Bennett series #10.5)
 "Night Sniper" (2017), with Christopher Charles
 "Nooners" (2017)
 "Private Gold" (2017), with Jassy Mackenzie (Private series #13.5)
 "Scott Free" (2017), with Rob Hart
 "Stealing Gulfstreams" (2017), with Max DiLallo
 "Steeplechase" (2017), with Scott Slaven
 "Stingrays" (2017)
 "Tell Me Your Best Story" (2017), with Emily Raymond
 "The Dolls" (2017), with Kecia Bal
 "The Exile" (2017), with Alison Joseph
 "The Family Lawyer" (2017), with Robert Rotstein
 "The Good Sister" (2017), with Rachel Howzell Hall
 "The Housewife" (2017), with Sam Hawken
 "The House Husband" (2017), with Duane Swierczynski
 "The Lawyer Lifeguard" (2017), with Doug Allyn
 "The Lifesaver" (2017), with Frank Constantini and Brian Sitts
 "The Medical Examiner" (2017), with Maxine Paetro (Women's Murder Club series #16.5)
 "The Moores are Missing" (2017), with Loren D. Estleman
 "The Shut-In" (2017), with Duane Swierczynski
 "You've Been Warned" (2017), with Derek Nikitas
 "The Doctor's Plot" (2018), with Connor Hyde
 "The House Next Door" (2019), with Susan DiLallo
 "The Killer's Wife" (2019), with Max DiLallo
 "We. Are. Not. Alone" (2019), with Tim Arnold

Fiction written for young adults

Novels 

Maximum Ride / Hawk series
 Maximum Ride series:
 The Angel Experiment (2005), New York: Little, Brown and Company 
 School's Out - Forever (2006), New York: Little, Brown and Company 
 Saving the World and Other Extreme Sports (2007), New York: Little, Brown and Company 
 The Final Warning (2008), New York: Little, Brown and Company 
 MAX (2009), New York: Little, Brown and Company 
 Fang (2010), New York: Little, Brown and Company 
 Angel (2011), New York: Little, Brown and Company 
 Nevermore (2012), New York: Little, Brown and Company 
 Maximum Ride Forever (2015), New York: Little, Brown and Company 
 Maximum Ride: Hawk series:
 Hawk (2020), with Gabrielle Charbonnet, New York: Little, Brown and Company 
 City of the Dead (2021), with Mindy McGinnis, New York: Little, Brown and Company   

Daniel X series
 The Dangerous Days of Daniel X (2008), with Michael Ledwidge, New York: Little, Brown and Company 
 1.5. Daniel X: Alien Hunter (2008), with Leopoldo Gout, comic
 Watch the Skies (2009), with Ned Rust, New York: Little, Brown and Company 
 Demons and Druids (2010), with Adam Sadler, New York: Little, Brown and Company 
 Game Over (2011), with Ned Rust, New York: Little, Brown and Company 
 Armageddon (2012), with Chris Grabenstein, New York: Little, Brown and Company 
 Lights Out (2015), with Chris Grabenstein, New York: Little, Brown and Company 

Witch & Wizard series
 Witch & Wizard (2009), with Gabrielle Charbonnet, New York: Little, Brown and Company 
 The Gift (2010), with Ned Rust, New York: Little, Brown and Company 
 The Fire (2011), with Jill Dembowski, New York: Little, Brown and Company 
 The Kiss (2013), with Jill Dembowski, New York: Little, Brown and Company 
 The Lost (2014), with Emily Raymond, New York: Little, Brown and Company 

Confessions series
 Confessions of a Murder Suspect (2012), with Maxine Paetro, New York: Little, Brown and Company 
 Confessions: The Private School Murders (2013), with Maxine Paetro, New York; Boston: Little, Brown and Company 
 Confessions: The Paris Mysteries (2014), with Maxine Paetro, New York: Little, Brown and Company 
 Confessions: The Murder of an Angel (2015), with Maxine Paetro, New York; Boston: Little, Brown and Company 

Stand-alones
 First Love (2014), with Emily Raymond, New York: Little, Brown and Company 
 Homeroom Diaries (2014), with Lisa Papademetriou, illustrated by Keino, New York: Little, Brown and Company 
 Humans, Bow Down (2016), with Emily Raymond, Jill Dembowski, illustrated by Alexander Ovchinnikov, New York: Little, Brown and Company 
 Sophia, Princess Among Beasts (2019), with Emily Raymond

Comics 

Maximum Ride: The Manga series
 Maximum Ride, Vol. 1 (2009), with NaRae Lee
 Maximum Ride, Vol. 2 (2009), with NaRae Lee
 Maximum Ride, Vol. 3 (2010), with NaRae Lee
 Maximum Ride, Vol. 4 (2011), with NaRae Lee
 Maximum Ride, Vol. 5 (2011), with NaRae Lee
 Maximum Ride, Vol. 6 (2012), with NaRae Lee
 Maximum Ride, Vol. 7 (2013), with NaRae Lee
 Maximum Ride, Vol. 8 (2014), with NaRae Lee
 Maximum Ride, Vol. 9 (2015), with NaRae Lee
 Maximum Ride, Vol. 10 (expected publication: 2020), with NaRae Lee
 Maximum Ride, Vol. 11 (2018), with NaRae Lee

Daniel X: The Manga series
 Daniel X: The Manga, Vol 1 (2010), with Michael Ledwidge and Seung-Hui Kye
 Daniel X: The Manga, Vol 2 (2011), with Ned Rust and Seung-Hui Kye
 Daniel X: The Manga, Vol 3 (2012), with Adam Sadler and Seung-Hui Kye

Witch & Wizard series
 Witch & Wizard Graphic Novel series:
 Battle for Shadowland (2010), with Dara Naraghi
 Operation Zero (2011), with Víctor Santos
 Witch & Wizard: The Manga series:
 Witch & Wizard: The Manga, Vol. 1 (2011), with Gabrielle Charbonnet
 Witch & Wizard: The Manga, Vol. 2 (2012), with Ned Rust
 Witch & Wizard: The Manga, Vol. 3 (2013), with Jill Dembowski

Stand-alones
 Zoo: The Graphic Novel (2012), with Michael Ledwidge

Fiction written for children

Novels 

Middle School series
 Middle School: The Worst Years of My Life (2011), with Christopher Tebbets, illustrated by Laura Park, New York: Little, Brown and Company 
 Middle School: Get Me Out of Here! (2012), with Christopher Tebbets, illustrated by Laura Park, New York: Little, Brown and Company 
 My Brother Is a Big, Fat Liar (2013), with Lisa Papademetriou, illustrated by Neil Swaab, New York: Little, Brown and Company 
 How I Survived Bullies, Broccoli, and Snake Hill (2013), with Christopher Tebbets, illustrated by Laura Park, New York: Little, Brown and Company 
 Ultimate Showdown (2014), with Julia Bergen, illustrated by Alec Longstreth, New York: Little, Brown and Company 
 5.5. How I Got Lost in London (2014)
 Save Rafe! (2014), with Christopher Tebbets, illustrated by Laura Park, New York: Little, Brown and Company 
 Just My Rotten Luck (2015), with Christopher Tebbets, illustrated by Laura Park, New York: Little, Brown and Company 
 7.25. Rafe's Aussie Adventure (2015)
 7.5. Going Bush (2016), with Martin Chatterton
 Dog's Best Friend (2016), with Christopher Tebbets, illustrated by Jomike Tejido, New York: Little, Brown and Company 
 Middle School: Hollywood 101 (2016), with Martin Chatterton
 Escape to Australia (2017), with Martin Chatterton, illustrated by Daniel Griffo, New York: Little, Brown and Company 
 Middle School: G'day, America (2018), with Martin Chatterton
 From Hero to Zero (2018), with Christopher Tebbets
 Born to Rock (2019), with Christopher Tebbets
 Middle School: Master of Disaster (2020), with Christopher Tebbets
 Middle School: Field Trip Fiasco (2021), with Martin Chatterton 
 Middle School: It's a Zoo in Here! (2022), with Brian Sitts

Ali Cross trilogy
 Ali Cross (2020)
 Like Father Like Son (2021)
 The Secret Detective (2022)
I Funny series
 I Funny (2012), with Chris Grabenstein, illustrated by Laura Park, New York: Little, Brown and Company 
 I Even Funnier: A Middle School Story (2013), with Chris Grabenstein, illustrated by Laura Park, New York: Little, Brown and Company 
 I Totally Funniest: A Middle School Story (2015), with Chris Grabenstein, illustrated by Laura Park, New York: Little, Brown and Company 
 I Funny TV: A Middle School Story (2015), with Chris Grabenstein, illustrated by Laura Park, New York: Little, Brown and Company 
 I Funny School of Laughs: A Middle School Story (2017), with Chris Grabenstein, illustrated by Laura Park, New York: Little, Brown and Company
 The Nerdiest, Wimpiest, Dorkiest I Funny Ever (2018), with Chris Grabenstein

Treasure Hunters series
 Treasure Hunters (2013), with Chris Grabenstein and Mark Shulman, illustrated by Juliana Neufeld, New York: Little, Brown and Company 
 Danger Down the Nile (2014), with Chris Grabenstein, illustrated by Juliana Neufeld, New York: Little, Brown and Company 
 Secret of the Forbidden City (2015), with Chris Grabenstein, illustrated by Juliana Neufeld, New York: Little, Brown and Company 
 Peril at the Top of the World (2016), with Chris Grabenstein, illustrated by Juliana Neufeld, New York: Little, Brown and Company 
 Quest for the City of Gold (2017), with Chris Grabenstein
 All-American Adventure (2019), with Chris Grabenstein
 The Plunder Down Under (2020), with Chris Grabenstein
 The Ultimate Quest (2022), with Chris Grabenstein

House of Robots series
 House of Robots (2014), with Chris Grabenstein, illustrated by Juliana Neufeld, New York: Little, Brown and Company 
 Robots Go Wild! (2015), with Chris Grabenstein, illustrated by Juliana Neufeld, New York: Little, Brown and Company 
 Robot Revolution! (2017), with Chris Grabenstein, illustrated by Juliana Neufeld, New York: Little, Brown and Company 
 House of Robots 4 (2022)

Jacky Ha-Ha series
 Jacky Ha-Ha (2016), with Chris Grabenstein, illustrated by Kerascoët, New York: Little, Brown and Company 
 Jacky Ha-Ha: My Life is a Joke (2017), with Chris Grabenstein

Dog Diaries series
 Dog Diaries (2018), with Steven Butler, New York: Little, Brown and Company 
 Happy Howlidays! (2018), with Steven Butler
 Mission Impawsible (2019), with Steven Butler
 Curse of the Mystery Mutt (2019), with Steven Butler
 Camping Chaos! (2020), with Steven Butler
 Dinosaur Disaster (2022), with Steven Butler

Max Einstein series
 Max Einstein: The Genius Experiment (2018), with Chris Grabenstein, New York: Little, Brown and Company 
 Max Einstein: Rebels With A Cause (2019), with Chris Grabenstein
 Max Einstein: Saves the Future (2020), with Chris Grabenstein
Katt  Dogg series

 Katt vs. Dogg (2019), with Chris Grabenstein
 Katt Loves Dogg (2021), with Chris Grabenstein
Stand-alones
 Public School Superhero (2015), with Christopher Tebbetts, illustrated by Cory Thomas, New York: Little, Brown and Company 
 Word of Mouse (2016), with Chris Grabenstein, illustrated by Joe Sutphin, New York: Little, Brown and Company 
 Laugh Out Loud (2017), with Chris Grabenstein
 Not So Normal Norbert (2018), with Joey Green, New York: Knopf & Little, Brown and Company
 Unbelievably Boring Bart (2018), with Duane Swierczynski, New York: Knopf & Little, Brown and Company 
 Becoming Muhammad Ali (expected publication: 2020), with Kwame Alexander

Short stories 
 "Boys Will Be Boys" (2011), Guys Read series, New York: Walden Pond Press

Picture Books 

Little Geniuses series
 Big Words for Little Geniuses (2017), with Susan Patterson, illustrated by Hsinping Pan, picture book, New York: Little, Brown and Company 
 Cuddly Critters for Little Geniuses (2018), with Susan Patterson, illustrated by Hsinping Pan, picture book, New York: JIMMY Patterson Books, Little, Brown and Company 

Stand-alones
 SantaKid (2004), illustrated by Michael Garland, picture book, New York: Little, Brown and Company 
 Give Please a Chance (2016), with Bill O'Reilly, picture book
 Give Thank You a Try (2017), picture book
 Penguins of America (2017), picture book
 The Candies Save Christmas (2017), picture book
 The Candies Trick or Treat (2018), picture book
 Pottymouth and Stoopid (2016), illustrated by Chris Grabenstein

Max Einstein seriesMax Einstein: The Genius ExperimentMax Einstein: Rebels with a CauseMax Einstein: Saves the FutureMax Einstein: World ChampionsJacky Ha-Ha seriesJacky Ha-Ha (released on March 21, 2016), with Chris Grabenstein and KerascoëtJacky Ha-Ha: My Life is a Joke  (released on October 30, 2021), with Chris Grabenstein and Kerascoët

Comics

 Jacky Ha-Ha: A Graphic Novel (2020), with Chris GrabensteinJacky Ha-Ha: My Life is a Joke: A Graphic Novel (2021), with Chris Grabenstein

 Non-fiction 

Biographies
 Torn Apart (2008), with Hal Friedman
 Against Medical Advice (2008), with Hal Friedman, memoirs, New York: Little, Brown and Company 
 Med Head: My Knock-down, Drag-out, Drugged-up Battle with My Brain (2010), with Hal Friedman, memoirs, New York: Little, Brown and Company 
 The House of Kennedy (2020), with Cynthia Fagen
 The Last Days of John Lennon (2020), with Casey Sherman and Dave Wedge, New York: Little, Brown and Company 

History
 The Murder of King Tut (2009), with Martin Dugard, New York: Little, Brown and Company 

Politics
 Trump vs. Clinton: In Their Own Words (2016), Bookshots 

Sociology
 The Day America Told the Truth (1991), with Peter Kim, New York: Prentice Hall Press 
 The Second American Revolution: The People's Plan for Fixing America-Before Its Too Late (1994), with Peter Kim, New York: William Morrow and Company 

True events
 Filthy Rich (2016), with John Connolly and Tim Malloy, New York: Little, Brown and Company 
 All-American Murder: The Rise and Fall of Aaron Hernandez, the Superstar Whose Life Ended on Murderers' Row (2018), with Alex Abramovich and Mike Harvkey
 Discovery's Murder is Forever also known as Investigation Discovery's True Crime series:
 Murder, Interrupted (2018), Grand Central Publishing 
 Home Sweet Murder (2018), Grand Central Publishing 
 Murder Beyond The Grave (2018), Grand Central Publishing 
 Murder Thy Neighbor (2020), Grand Central Publishing 
 Murder of Innocence (2020), Grand Central Publishing 
 Till Murder Do Us Part (2021), Grand Central Publishing 

Memoir
 James Patterson by James Patterson: The Stories of My Life'' (2022): Little, Brown and Company

References

 
Bibliographies by writer
Bibliographies of American writers